Wallisia anceps is a species of flowering plant in the genus Wallisia. This species is native to Central America, Colombia, Ecuador, Trinidad and Tobago, the Guianas, Venezuela and northern Brazil.

References

Tillandsioideae
Flora of Central America
Flora of South America
Flora of Trinidad and Tobago
Plants described in 1823